Francis Parker House, also known as Parker's Big Run or High House, is a historic home located near Murfreesboro, Northampton County, North Carolina. It was built about 1785, and is a -story, hall and parlor plan, Georgian style frame dwelling with a one-story rear wing.  It has a gambrel roof, is sheathed in weatherboard, sits on a raised brick basement, and rebuilt massive paved double-shoulder exterior end chimneys.  The house was moves to its present location in 1976.  The contributing Vaughan house and pyramidal-roof frame dairy (formerly located in Hertford County near the Parker house), were also moved to the site.

It was listed on the National Register of Historic Places in 1983.

References

Houses on the National Register of Historic Places in North Carolina
Georgian architecture in North Carolina
Houses completed in 1785
Houses in Northampton County, North Carolina
National Register of Historic Places in Northampton County, North Carolina
Buildings and structures in Murfreesboro, North Carolina